Javier Muñoz may refer to:

Javier Muñoz (Spanish footballer) (born 1995), Spanish footballer for Real Madrid Castilla
Javier Muñoz (Argentine footballer) (born 1980), Argentine footballer for Chiapas F.C.
Javier Muñoz (actor) (born 1975), American stage actor